Atargatis was the chief goddess of northern Syria in Classical antiquity. Primarily she was a fertility goddess, but, as the baalat ("mistress") of her city and people she was also responsible for their protection and well-being. Her chief sanctuary was at Hierapolis, modern Manbij, northeast of Aleppo, Syria.

Michael Rostovtzeff called her "the great mistress of the North Syrian lands". Her consort is usually Hadad. As Ataratheh, doves and fish were considered sacred to her: doves as an emblem of the Love-Goddess, and fish as symbolic of the fertility and life of the waters.

According to a third-century Syriac source, "In Syria and in Urhâi [Edessa] the men used to castrate themselves in honor of Taratha. But when King Abgar became a believer, he commanded that anyone who emasculated himself should have a hand cut off. And from that day to the present no one in Urhâi emasculates himself anymore".

She is sometimes  described as a mermaid-goddess, due to identification of her with a fish-bodied goddess at Ashkelon.

Origin and name
Atargatis is seen as a continuation of Bronze Age goddesses. At Ugarit, cuneiform tablets attest multiple Canaanite goddesses, among them three are considered as relevant to theories about the origin of Atargatis:
 ʾAṭirat, described as "Lady of the Sea" (rabbatu ʾaṭiratu yammi) and "mother of the gods"
ʿAnat, a war goddess
ʿAțtart, a goddess of the hunt also sharing Anat's warlike role, regarded as analogous to Ishtar and Ishara in Ugaritic god lists and as such possibly connected to love

John Day asserts that all three shared many traits with each other and may have been worshipped in conjunction or separately during 1500 years of cultural history. While the worship of Ashtart and Anat as a pair is well attested,  Steve A. Wiggins found no evidence Ashtart was ever conflated with Athirat. He also pointed out that the concept of Athirat, Anat and Ashtart as a trinity of sorts (popularized by authors like Tikva Frymer-Kensky), is modern and ignores the role of other deities in Ugarit - for example Shapash; as well as the importance of the connection between Athirat and El.

The name  was composed of:
  (from earlier ), which during the Iron Age had evolved from being the name of the goddess ʿAṯtart to become used to mean "goddess" in general, and was used in the name  in the sense of "goddess";

Classical period 

Various Greek and Latin writers have written about the goddess Atargatis or Derketo.

Atargatis generally appears as the wife of Hadad. They are the protecting deities of the community. Atargatis, wearing a mural crown, is the ancestor the royal house, the founder of social and religious life, the goddess of generation and fertility (hence the prevalence of phallic emblems), and the inventor of useful appliances.

Derceto was venerated in mermaid form, i.e., with "a face of a woman, and otherwise the entire body of a fish" in a shrine by Ashkelon, Syria, according to Diodorus (1st century BCE), drawing on Ctesias (5th century BCE); the attached myth explaining that Derceto transformed into a fish, after drowning herself in a nearby lake. The goddess was presumably revered in that fish-form at Ashkelon. It has been conjectured that the veneration of the goddess did indeed occur at Ashkelon and may have originated there. 

The image of Derceto as half-woman half-fish was also witnessed by Lucian (2nd century) somewhere in Phoenicia (i.e., Phoenice Syria), but at the Holy City of Phoenicia (Hierapolis Bambyce), she was depicted entirely as a woman. This temple was nominally dedicated to "Hera", but some thought it actually consecrated Derceto.
 Lucian in a later passage gives a description at length of this "Hera" whom the locals "call by a different name" (Atargatis), at Hierapolis. The goddess was posed seated with two lions on her sides, "In one hand she had a scepter, in the other a spindle, and on her head she wears rays, a tower [mural crown]..", and she wore a girdle as well. The head was set with a gemstone called  which glowed by night.

The worship of Atargatis going back to the Hellenistic Phoenicia (Seleucid Syria) is evidenced by inscriptions at Akko.

Iconography 

The literary attestations as already given are that Derceto was depicted as fish-tailed goddess at Ashkelon (by Ctesias after Diodorus), and later at Hieropolis (by Lucian).

But all of the extant iconography of the Syriac goddess catalogued in the LIMC shows her as anthropomorphic. But the "fish-goddess form of Atargatis" were among the finds unearthed in the Transjordan, or so Glueck (cf. infra) has insisted, though only her forms as goddess of "foliage and fruits" or cereal goddess were published in his paper.

Numismatics 

The tetradrachm issued under Demetrius III Eucaerus (96–87 BCE, coin image above) shows a fish-bodied figure on the reverse side, which scholarship identifies as Stargateis. The cult statues of Stargateis and her consort Hadad were commonly employed on as the motif on the reverse of tetradrachm coinage by this monarch and by Antiochus XII Dionysus (87– 84 BCE) who succeeded him.

Hieropolis Bambyce was one of the cities which minted its own coins. And some of the Hieropolitan coinage portray "Atargatis as indeed seated between lions and holds a scepter in her right hand and probably a spindle in her left", just as Lucian had described. Palmyra coinage also depicts a Tyche on the obverse and strolling lion on the reverse; one coin also depicts a goddess mounted on a lion, and the lion symbolism suggest that Atargatis is being represented.

Coinage of Palmyra, some of which were found in the Palmyrene colony at Dura-Europos, may depict the goddess. The coin with Tyche on the obverse and a strolling lion on the reverse, and one with a goddess riding a lion points to Atargatis, based on the lion motif. There has also been found one Palmyrene tessera (token) inscribed with Atargatis's name.

Sculptures  

A relief fragment found at Dura-Europos is thought to represent Atargatis/Tyche (Yale-French excavations, 1935–46), as it shows a pair of doves that are sacred to Atargatis besides her head; the doves are assumed to be perched on the post of her throne, which is missing. The figure's mural crown is emblematic of a Tyche (protector-goddess) of a city, but this matches the historic account that the cult relief Atargatis Hierapolis was seen wearing a mural crown.

In the temples of Atargatis at Palmyra and at Dura-Europos she appeared repeatedly with her consort, Hadad, and in the richly syncretic religious culture at Dura-Europos, was worshipped as Artemis Azzanathkona.

In the 1930s, numerous Nabatean bas-relief busts of Atargatis were identified by Nelson Glueck at Khirbet et-Tannûr, Jordan, in temple ruins of the early first century CE; there the lightly veiled goddess's lips and eyes had once been painted red, and a pair of fish confronted one another above her head. Her wavy hair, suggesting water to Glueck, was parted in the middle. At Petra the goddess from the north was syncretised with a North Arabian goddess from the south al-Uzzah, worshipped in the one temple. At Dura-Europus among the attributes of Atargatis are the spindle and the sceptre or fish-spear.

Mythology 
The legends are numerous and of an astrological character. A rationale for the Syrian dove-worship and abstinence from fish is seen in the story in Athenaeus 8.37, where Atargatis is naively explained to mean "without Gatis", the name of a queen who is said to have forbidden the eating of fish.

Diodorus Siculus (2.4.2), quoting Ctesius of Cnidus, tells how Derceto fell in love with a beautiful youth named Simios (also Ichthys, meaning 'fish') and bore a daughter but becoming ashamed of the illicit love, Derceto flung herself into a lake near Ashkelon and her body was changed into the form of a fish though her head remained human. In Diodorus's version of the legend, Derceto also depsite the child from this union and had exposed the daughter to the desert, where she was raised by doves. This child grew up to be Semiramis, the legendary Assyrian queen. Lucian also notes that the erection of the temple at Hieropolis was ascribed by some to Semiramis who dedicated it to her mother Derceto.

The Blessed Anne Catherine Emmerich recounts in her Life of Christ, in the section between the Tower of Babel and Abraham, she writes about mystical visions granted to her of Derketo.
"From Derketo to Semiramis, I saw three generations of daughters. Derketo was a tall, powerful woman. I saw her clothed in skins with numerous straps and animals tails hanging about her. Her head was covered by a cap made of the feathers of birds. I saw her with a great train of followers, male and female, sallying forth from the neighborhood of Babylon. She was constantly envision, or enraged in prophesying, offering sacrifice, founding cities, or roving about. She and her followers drove before them scattered tribes with their herds, prophesied on the subject of good dwelling places, piled up stones some of which were immense, offered sacrifice, and practiced all kinds of wickedness. She drew all to herself. She was sometimes here, sometimes there. She was everywhere honored. She had in her old age a daughter, who played a part similar to her own. I saw this vision in a plain, by which was signified the origin of the abomination. Lastly, I saw Derketo as a fearful old woman in a city by the sea. She was again carrying on her sorcery by the seashore. She was in a state of diabolical ecstasy, and she was proclaiming to her people that she must die for them, give her life for them. She told them that she could remain with them no longer, but that she would be transformed into a fish and as such be always near to them. She gave directions for the worship to be paid her and, in presence of the assembled multitude, plunged into the sea. Soon after a fish arose above the waves, and the people saluted it with sacrifices and abominations of all kinds. Their divinations were full of mysteries, signs, etc, connected with water. Through Derketo's instrumentality, an entire system of idolatry arose."

Analysis 
Ctesias's account, according to one analysis, is composed of two myths, the Derceto transformation myth, and the Semiramis birth myth, and a telling of each myth are told by a number of classical writers.

The first myth (the Derceto metamorphosis into fish) is told, e.g., by Ovid as a Dione-Cupid myth. The irony is that even though Ovid explicitly mentions Derceto of Babylonia transforming into a fish, Ovid's version of this first myth (detailed below) is recorded in Fasti, and fails to mention the goddess in Syria (Dione) metamorphosing into fish-shape. The metamorphosis thereafter needs be reconstructed by consulting other sources which preserves that original ending.

The second myth (the Semiramis birth myth) is told by various writers as an alternate version of the birth of Venus (from an egg carried ashore by fish, then hatched by doves), however, Ctesias felt compelled to "drop" the egg element according to the analysis. This seemed a gratuitous ("incredible") excision to the analyst, given that Venus's birth from an ocean-found egg was not a far cry from the familiar version of the Aphrodite/Venus's genesis out of water (sea-foam).

Syrian Venus 

Ovid in Fasti recounts the legend that the goddess Dione accompanied by Cupid/Eros plunged into the river in Palestine (Euphrates), whereby a  pair of fish came to convey then through water to aid her escape from Typhon. The fish pair was commemorated as the constellation Pisces of the zodiac, and local Syrians abstain from eating fish on account of it. Menander and others also relate this legend, and some of the versions, say that the goddess and Cupid subsequently transformed into fish, possibly preserving the original telling.

The name Dione could refer to Aphrodite's mother, but it was also an epithet of Aphrodite/Venus herself. So the legend has also been told as one of Venus with Cupid casting herself into the Euphrates, then transforming into fish.

The second myth describes the birth of Syrian Venus as originating in an egg that fell into the Euphrates, rolled onto land by fish, was hatched in the clutches of doves (scholia to Germanicus's Aratus; Hyginus, Fabulae). 

The author of Catasterismi explained the constellation of Piscis Austrinus as the parent of the two fish making up the constellation of Pisces; according to that account, it was placed in the heavens in memory of Derceto's fall into the lake at Hierapolis Bambyce near the Euphrates in Syria, from which she was saved by a large fish — which again is intended to explain the Syrian abstinence from fish.

Syncretism 

In many cases Atargatis, ‘Ashtart, and other goddesses who once had independent cults and mythologies became fused to such an extent as to be indistinguishable. This fusion is exemplified by the temple at Carnion (Carnaim), which is probably identical with the famous temple of ‘Ashtart at Ashtaroth-Karnaim.

Not unnaturally she is identified with the Greek Aphrodite. By the conjunction of her many functions (as fertility goddess and of appliances), she becomes ultimately a great nature-goddess analogous to Cybele and Rhea, despite originating as a sea deity analogous to Amphitrite. In one aspect she typifies the protection of water in producing life; in another, the universal of other-earth; in a third (influenced, no doubt, by Chaldean astrology), the power of Destiny. She was also identified with Hera by Lucian in his De Dea Syria.

As a consequence of the first half of the name, Atargatis has frequently, though wrongly, been identified as Ashtart. The two deities were probably of common origin and have many features in common, but their cults are historically distinct. There is reference in 2 Maccabees 12.26 and 1 Maccabees 5:43 to an Atargateion or Atergateion, a temple of Atargatis, at Carnion in Gilead, but the home of the goddess was unquestionably not Israel or Canaan, but Syria itself; at Hierapolis Bambyce she had a temple in her name.

A recent analysis of the cult of Atargatis is an essay by Per Bilde, in which Atargatis appears in the context of other Hellenized Great Goddesses of the East.

Cult

Temples 

At her temples at Ashkelon, Hierapolis Bambyce, and Edessa, there were fish ponds containing fish only her priests might touch. Glueck noted in his 1937 paper that "to this day there is a sacred fish-pond swarming with untouchable fish at Qubbet el-Baeddwī, a dervish monastery three kilometres east of Tripolis, Lebanon."

The relief sculpture of the Syrian Goddess at Hierapolis was supported by a pair of tritonesses according 
Lucian.

Cult sites in the Near East include Dura-Europos, Palmyra, Akko (Ptolemais), Carnaim and Nabataea. Two well preserved temples in Niha, Lebanon are dedicated to her and to her consort Hadad.

From Syria, the worship of Atargatis and Hadad extended to Greece and to the furthest West into the Mediterranean. Lucian and Apuleius gave descriptions of the beggar-priests who went round the great cities with an image of the goddess on an ass and collected money. The wide extension of the cult is attributable largely to Syrian merchants; thus we find traces of it in the great seaport towns; at Delos especially numerous inscriptions have been found bearing witness to her importance. Again we find the cult in Sicily, introduced, no doubt, by slaves and mercenary troops, who carried it even to the farthest northern limits of the Roman Empire. The leader of the rebel slaves in the First Servile War, a Syrian named Eunus, claimed to receive visions of Atargatis, whom he identified with the Demeter of Enna.

Priesthood 

During the Roman era, eunuch priests worshipped Atargatis, similar to the Galli priests of Cybele. At the shrine in Hieropolis founded by Semiramis, eunuch priests served the image of a fish-tailed woman. Rituals to the goddess were accompanied by flute playing and rattle shaking. In one rite, young males castrated themselves to become cross-dressing priests at the temple and thereafter performed tasks usually done by women. The obligatory lake or pond lay nearby, full of sacred fish which no one was allowed to eat; nor could anyone eat Atargatis's sacred doves. The priests were described by Apuleius as mendicants that traveled around with an image of the goddess dressed in a silken robe on the back of a donkey. When they arrived at village squares or a receptive estate they would perform an ecstatic rite, designed to attract a crowd and elicit their contributions. The priests were described as effeminate, wearing heavy makeup, turbans on their heads, and dressed in saffron colored robes of silk and linen; some in white tunics painted with purple stripes. They shouted and danced wildly to the music of flutes, whirling around with necks bent so that their long hair flew out; and in an ecstatic frenzy they would bite their own flesh and cut their arms with knives until they bled.

According to a story retold by Lucian, the Assyrian queen Stratonice saw in a vision that she must build a temple at Hieropolis to the goddess and so the king sent her there with a young man named Combabus to execute the task. Knowing the queen's reputation Combabus castrated himself and left his genitals, sealed in a box. When the queen fell in love with Combabus and tried to seduce him, he revealed his mutilation, but this didn't dissuade her from desiring his constant companionship. When Stratonice and Combabus returned home, she accused him of trying to seduce her, and Combabus was arrested, tried, and sentenced to death. Combabus called for the sealed box to prove his innocence, where upon the king relented and rewarded Combabus for his loyalty. The temple was completed and a statue of Combabus was placed in it. This is said to be the origin of the practice of castration by the priests in the temple.

Another story ascribed to Combabus mentions that a certain foreign woman who had joined a sacred assembly, beholding a human form of extreme beauty and dressed in man's attire, became violently enamoured of him: after discovering that he was a eunuch, she committed suicide. Combabus accordingly in despair at his incapacity for love, donned woman's attire, so that no woman in future might be deceived in the same way.

See also

Explanatory notes

References 
Citations

Sources

 
 
 
 
 
 
 
 
 
 
 
 
 
 
 
 Weinfeld, Moshe (1991). "Semiramis: her name and her origin." In: Mordechai Cogan; Israel Eph’al (ed.), Ah, Assyria...:Studies in Assyrian history and ancient Near Eastern historiography presented to Hayim Tadmor (series Scripta Hierosolymitana 33), Jerusalem: Magnes Press, Hebrew University, pp. 99–103.

External links

 Atargatis by Abufares
 Jewish Encyclopedia: Derceto
 Britannica Online Encyclopædia: "Atargatis"
 Atargatis, the "Syrian Goddess" by Johanna Stuckey 
 Lucian of Samosata, Concerning the Syrian Goddess (English translation & commentary)

West Semitic goddesses
Sea and river goddesses
Hellenistic Asian deities
Fertility goddesses
Gilead
Books of the Maccabees
Mermaids
Anat
Asherah
Astarte
Phoenician mythology
Lion deities